The Ferrovie dello Stato (Italian State Railways, FS) Class 737 (Italian: Gruppo 737) was a class of steam locomotive which consisted of 15 ex-British War Department (WD) 2-8-0 locomotives of the LMS Stanier Class 8F type which were purchased in 1946.

History
The first eight engines, (eventually FS Numbers 737.001 – 737.008) were built to WD orders between 1940 and 1942.  The remaining seven (eventually FS Numbers 737.009 – 737.015) had been requisitioned by the War Department in 1941 from the London Midland & Scottish Railway (LMS) - these had been built in 1936 by the Vulcan Foundry.  All were then shipped to the Middle East, with several more classmates, where they served in Persia and were numbered in the Persian series.  In 1944, 50 of the Persian engines were transferred to Kingdom of Egypt/Mandate Palestine, where they were again renumbered into the Middle East Forces (MEF) 93xx series.  Later WD numbers were original numbers plus +70000, and in 1946 FS bought fifteen of these.

As they were non-standard in comparison to Italian locomotive practices, their career were relatively short, with the Class 737s working on the line between Bologna and Ancona until 1947 where after they were kept at Bari. They were all withdrawn from service in 1953 with them being scrapped in 1956.

Numbering
Numbers were as follows:

See also
 Palestine Railways
 Trans-Iranian Railway

References

Sources

 

737
LMS Stanier Class 8F
2-8-0 locomotives
Railway locomotives introduced in 1946
Scrapped locomotives
Standard gauge locomotives of Italy
1′D h2 locomotives